The Medical Practitioners Disciplinary Tribunal of New Zealand hears and determines disciplinary proceedings brought against medical practitioners under Part VIII of the Medical Practitioners Act of 1995.

The Tribunal comprises a Chair, a senior Deputy Chair, a Deputy Chair and a panel of not fewer than 12 members, all appointed by the Minister of Health. When the Tribunal sits to hear and determine any matter it sits with a Chair or Deputy Chair and four members, three of whom are medical practitioners, and one person who is not a medical practitioner.

The Medical Practitioners Disciplinary Tribunal is in the process of being superseded by the Health Practitioners Disciplinary Tribunal of New Zealand, established under the Health Practitioners Competence Assurance Act 2003 which came into effect on 18 September 2004.

External links
 Medical Practitioners Disciplinary Tribunal of New Zealand Official Site
 New Zealand Health Practitioners Disciplinary Tribunal Official Site

Medical and health organisations based in New Zealand
Health law in New Zealand